Gianluigi Gelmetti OMRI, (11 September 1945 – 11 August 2021) was an Italian-Monégasque conductor and composer.

Early life
Gianluigi Gelmetti was born on 11 September 1945 in Rome, Italy. When 16-years old, Sergiu Celibidache let him conduct an orchestra, then took him as a pupil. He subsequently studied with Franco Ferrara and Hans Swarowsky. In 1967 he won the “Firenze” prize.

Career
Following his debut with the Berlin Philharmonic Orchestra, Gelmetti regularly performed as a conductor at international opera houses, concert halls, and festivals.
From 1989 to 1998 he was the Principal Conductor of the Stuttgart Radio Symphony Orchestra as well as the Schwetzingen Festival; and from 2000 to 2009, Musical and Artistic Director of Teatro dell'Opera di Roma. From 2004 to 2008 he was the Principal Conductor and Artistic Director of the Sydney Symphony Orchestra.
In 2012, he was appointed Principal Conductor of the Orchestre Philharmonique de Monte-Carlo, a post that he held until 2016. He was then named Chef Honoraire for life and was awarded the Monaco citizenship by H.S.H. Prince Albert II.

While at the Teatro dell'Opera di Roma he led some lesser-known or rediscovered lyric works; the world premiere of Marie Victoire (written in 1914 but never performed) and Marilyn (1980) by Lorenzo Ferrero; La fiamma (1933) by Ottorino Respighi; Sakùntala (1921) by Franco Alfano; and Iris (1898) by Pietro Mascagni. 
He notably conducted Mozart’s Don Giovanni, Le nozze di Figaro (earning him the "Best Conductor of the Year" prize from Opernwelt), Così fan tutte and The Magic Flute. Among other works he conducted: Francesca da Rimini, Das Rheingold and Falstaff in Monte-Carlo; William Tell in Zürich, Monte-Carlo and Paris; La forza del destino and Attila in Parma; Les vêpres siciliennes in Naples; Turandot in Tokyo; The Barber of Seville and I due Foscari in Toulouse; Un ballo in maschera, La traviata in Trieste; La fanciulla del West and Tosca in Liège; Rossini's Stabat Mater in Sarajevo. Most recently he led a video production of La Cenerentola directed by Carlo Verdone for Rada Film and Verdi's Messa da Requiem in Rome.

In Pesaro, Italy, at the end of last century, Gelmetti conducted several productions at the Rossini Opera Festival: Tancredi, La gazza ladra, Otello, Maometto II, He was awarded the Rossini d’Oro  for William Tell, a world premiere of the complete opera lasting over five hours.

Apart from opera, he regularly conducted symphonic concerts in Germany (Berlin, Bonn, Hamburg, Stuttgart, Munich, Cologne, Dresden, Leipzig); in France (Paris, Toulouse, Bordeaux, Lyon) in Spain (Madrid, Bilbao), in Italy; also the Czech Philharmonic, the Vienna Philharmonic, the London Symphony Orchestra in the UK, the St. Petersburg Philharmonic, the Qatar Philharmonic Orchestra, in Copenhagen, in Oslo. He was also seen performing in China and in Oman.
He is very much appreciated in Japan, where he conducted the NHK Symphony Orchestra, the Yomiuri Nippon Symphony Orchestra and the Japan Philharmonic Orchestra. He was awarded the Tokyo critics’ prize “Best Performance of the Year” for Symphony No. 9 (Beethoven).

His discography with EMI, Sony, RICORDI, FONIT, DECCA, TELDEC, NAXOS and AGORÀ, displays a vast and complex repertory: operas by Rossini, Puccini and Mozart; Ravel orchestral music; symphonies by Mozart, selected works by Stravinsky, Berg, Webern, Varèse and Nino Rota. Recent releases include two rare Rossini operas and Anton Bruckner’s Symphony No. 6.

Gelmetti also composed music. He wrote "In Paradisum Deducant Te Angeli", premiered in Rome and later performed in London, Munich, Frankfurt, Budapest, Sydney and Stuttgart; "Algos" for large orchestra, premiered in 1997 by the Münchner Philharmoniker and "Prasanta Atma", commissioned in 1999 to celebrate Sergiu Celibidache. More recently, the Teatro Comunale di Bologna commissioned him the "Cantata della Vita" for choir, cello solo and orchestra.

He has been teaching conducting at the Accademia Musicale Chigiana in Siena and at the Accademia Nazionale di Santa Cecilia in Rome.

Personal life
Gelmetti was created a Knight of the Order of the Arts and the Letters of France, Commander of the Order of Cultural Merit of Monaco, and Knight of Grand-Cross of the Order of Merit of the Italian Republic of Italy.

He died in Monaco on 11 August 2021, at the age of 75.

Partial discography
 Berg-Stravinsky-Ravel: Violin Concertos – Frank Peter Zimmermann Radio-Sinfonieorchester Stuttgart (EMI) (CD)
 Donizetti: “Les martyrs” Gencer/Bruson/Garaventa/Furlanetto Orch. Teatro La Fenice (CD)
 Mascagni: "Iris" Dessì/Cura/Servile/Ghiaurov Orchestra del Teatro dell'Opera di Roma (Ricordi) (CD)
 Mozart: Symphony nr. 40 / Sinfonia Concertante KV 364 – Frank Peter Zimmermann Radio-Sinfonie-Orchester Stuttgart (EMI) (CD)
 Mozart: “Die Entführung aus dem Serail” Swenson/Blochwitz/Rydl Radio-Sinfonieorchester Stuttgart (EuroArts) (DVD)
 Piccinni: "La Buona Figliola" E.Ravaglia/Lucia Aliberti/Margherita Rinaldi/R.Baldisseri/Ugo Benelli Orchestra del Teatro dell'Opera di Roma (FONIT-Cetra)
 Puccini: “La Bohème” Dessì/Sabbatini/Scarabelli/Gavanelli/Colombara Orchestra del Teatro Comunale Bologna (EMI) (CD)
 Puccini: "La Rondine" Gasdia/Cupido/Cosotti/Scarabelli Orchestra RAI Milano (FONIT-Cetra) (CD)
 Rossini: Overtures Radio-Sinfonie-Orchester Stuttgart (EMI) (CD)
 Rossini: “Il signor Bruschino” Corbelli/Felle/Kuebler/Rinaldi Radio-Sinfonieorchester Stuttgart (EuroArts) (DVD)
 Rossini: “L’occasione fa il ladro” Patterson/Gambill/De Carolis/Bacelli Radio-Sinfonieorchester Stuttgart (EuroArts) (DVD)
 Rossini: “La cambiale di matrimonio” Del Carlo/Hall/Kuebler/Rinaldi Radio-Sinfonieorchester Stuttgart (EuroArts) (DVD)
 Rossini: “La scala di seta” Serra/Kuebler/Corbelli/Rinaldi Radio-Sinfonieorchester Stuttgart (EuroArts) (DVD)
 Rossini: “Tancredi” Manca di Nissa/Bayo/Giménez/D’Arcangelo Radio-Sinfonieorchester Stuttgart (Arthaus) (DVD)
 Rossini: “Tancredi” Barcellona/Takova/Filianoti/Polverelli Orchestra regionale della Toscana ORT (Ricordi) (CD)
 Rossini: “La gazza ladra” Ricciarelli/Matteuzzi/Ramey/Manca di Nissa RAI Orchestra (Sony) (CD)
 Rossini: “Maometto II” Gasdia/Pertusi/Scalchi/Vargas/Piccoli Radio-Sinfonieorchester Stuttgart (Ricordi) (CD)
 Rossini: “Il barbiere di Siviglia” Bayo/Flórez/Spagnoli/Praticò/Raimondi Orchestra of Teatro Real Madrid (DECCA) (DVD)
 Rossini: “Il barbiere di Siviglia” Hampson/Mentzer/Hadley/Praticò/Ramey Orchestra regionale della Toscana ORT (EMI) (CD)
 Rossini: “Eduardo e Cristina” Polverelli/Dalla Benetta/Tarver Virtuosi Brunensis (NAXOS) (CD)
 Rossini: “Zelmira” Dalla Benetta/Comparato/Stewart/Süngü/Dall’Amico Virtuosi Brunensis (NAXOS) (CD)
 Rossini: Stabat Mater Flórez/Barcellona/Remigio/D’Arcangelo Orchestra regionale della Toscana ORT (Agorà) (CD)
 Rota: Film music Orchestre Philharmonique de Monte-Carlo (EMI) (CD)
 Salieri: “Les Danaïdes” Marshall/Giménez/Kavrakos/Cossutta Radio-Sinfonie-Orchester Stuttgart (EMI) (CD)
 Verdi: “Un ballo in maschera” Meli/Stoyanov/Lewis Orchestra del Teatro Regio di Parma (CMajor) (DVD)
 Verdi: “La forza del destino” Theodossiou/Stoyanov/Pentcheva/Machado/Scandiuzzi Orchestra del Teatro Regio di Parma (CMajor) (DVD)
 Verdi: Messa di Requiem – Rossini: Stabat Mater – Scalchi/Mazzaria/Dessì/Merritt/Ballo/Scandiuzzi Radio-Sinfonieorchester Stuttgart (Serenissima) (CD)

Notes

References
 Pâris, Alain, ed. (2015). Le nouveau dictionnaire des interprètes. Paris: Éditions Robert Laffont.

External links
 Gianluigi Gelmetti biography at the Music Partnership Limited

1945 births
2021 deaths
Musicians from Rome
Italian male conductors (music)
Italian male composers
Academic staff of the Accademia Nazionale di Santa Cecilia
Academic staff of Accademia Musicale Chigiana
21st-century Italian conductors (music)
21st-century Italian male musicians
Knights Grand Cross of the Order of Merit of the Italian Republic
Naturalized citizens of Monaco